Hattrick is a 2007 Indian Hindi sport-drama film directed by Milan Luthria, starring Rimi Sen, Kunal Kapoor, Nana Patekar, Danny Denzongpa, Paresh Rawal.

Plot 
Dr. Satyajit Chavan is the head doctor at a civil hospital in Delhi. Satyajit is well regarded and respected, but he has terrible bedside manners and is generally rude to everyone. His staff of doctors, most of whom are young interns fresh out of medical school, inquire about his bedside manner. He curtly informs them that his job is to treat patients and that beds must be allocated to the ones who are most likely to survive and get better. We discover that government hospitals (especially in large cities like Mumbai) are severely limited in bed space and attract the worst stricken patients in the city. These draconian conditions have shaped Satyajit and his views on treatment.

Sarbajeet "Saby" Singh and Kashmira Singh are a young Punjabi couple; they are about to marry. In a departure from the arranged marriages, they have chosen each other independently. They invite their parents to a joint dinner and inform them of their choice. The parents are cheerful to oblige, and they gladly arrange the wedding ceremony. Once married, however, Saby and Kashmira discover their varying interests and aspirations. The main conflict is around cricket: Saby is a great fan of cricket, and Kashmira does not care very much for the sport. Saby watches every India match with unfailing zeal. Kashmira however is left alone and unattended, and she gradually feels abandoned and unloved.

Hemendra "Hemu" Patel is a janitor working at a London airport. He represents the journey of a poor immigrant. His main goal is to secure British citizenship so that he can return to India with great ceremony (as he has seen bestowed upon his other relatives who have attained foreign citizenship). He deals with the cultural differences of his UK-inclined teenage daughter. His wife Priya is affectionate and supportive. Though she does not share his obsequious quest for British citizenship, she generally encourages him to achieve his goals.

David Abraham, affectionately called "Chinaman" by fans, is a celebrated Indian cricketer. He has retired from active international cricket, but he is frequently invited to games (for commentary), functions and sporting events as the guest of honor.

Saby's parents confront him. They point out that he has ignored Kashmira in his zealous enthusiasm for cricket. How will she be able to love him when he is not able to understand her needs? He finally understands this, and returns to Kashmira with a renewed zest for making her happy. They are reunited.

Cast 
Nana Patekar as Dr. Satyajit Chavan
Danny Denzongpa as David Abraham aka David Anna
Paresh Rawal as Hemendra Harshadbhai “Hemu” Patel (the illegal immigrant in UK)
Rimi Sen as Kashmira Singh (wife of the man obsessed with cricket)
Kunal Kapoor as Sarabjeet 'Saby' Singh (man obsessed with cricket)
Asawari Joshi as Priya Patel, Hemu Patel’s Wife
Prateeksha Lonkar as Mrs. Chavan
Manoj Pahwa as Aslam Shaikh
Amruta Khanvilkar as Hemendra patel's daughter
John Abraham as Guest appearance

Soundtrack

External links 
 
 
Review at businessofcinema.com
Review at rediff.com
Review at indiafm.com

2007 films
Films about cricket in India
2000s Hindi-language films
Indian sports comedy-drama films
Films featuring songs by Pritam
UTV Motion Pictures films
2000s sports comedy-drama films
Films set in London
Films directed by Milan Luthria
Films shot in London
Hyperlink films